The McConnell House is a historic home located in McConnellsburg Fulton County, Pennsylvania.  It was built about 1760, and is a -story, "L"-shaped, four bay, yellow pine log structure on a stone foundation.  The original rectangular section measures 27 feet by 24 feet, 6 inches.  It has a rear wing in two sections, with the newer section dated to 1834.  Its original occupant was Daniel McConnell, founder of McConnellsburg.

The house was listed on the National Register of Historic Places in 1976. It is located in the McConnellsburg Historic District.

References

Houses on the National Register of Historic Places in Pennsylvania
Houses completed in 1760
Houses in Fulton County, Pennsylvania
Historic district contributing properties in Pennsylvania
National Register of Historic Places in Fulton County, Pennsylvania